The Nikon D40 is Nikon F-mount entry-level digital SLR, announced November 16, 2006 and made until March 2009, when it was succeeded by the Nikon D3000. Compared to its predecessor, the D50, the D40 had several features removed, a few added, and a lower price: US$499.95 ESP as of November 2009 with the 18–55 mm G-II kit lens, positioning it as an entry-level model compared to the D80. The D40x (released March 6, 2007) has a 10-megapixel maximum resolution, up from 6 megapixels of the D40 and D50.

The D40 was the first Nikon DSLR without an in-body focus motor. Autofocus requires the use of a lens with an integrated autofocus-motor.

Despite being superseded by newer offerings, the Nikon D40 retained some significant advantages.

Features 

The Nikon D40 was less expensive than the Canon EOS 400D (also known as the Rebel XTi in the United States), the Pentax K110D, and the Olympus E-400, and is competitively priced against high-end bridge cameras (the D40 and D40x do not have live preview, unlike bridge digitals). It was launched accompanied by a new small kit lens, the AF-S DX Zoom-Nikkor 18–55 mm f/3.5-5.6G ED II. The D40's small size and low price made it attractive to point-and-shoot photographers moving up to their first SLR, however it does contain features and improvements that would appeal to enthusiasts as well.

Despite having a comparatively lower resolution for a DSLR introduced in 2006, the D40 held some benefits over its newer competition such as the Nikon D40x, D60, and Canon Rebels. Because only 6 megapixels are fit onto the standard Nikon DX format sensor, the sensitivity of each pixel is higher. The default sensitivity on the D40 is ISO 200, and the D40 adds an ISO 3200 speed (listed as "Hi1" in the camera menu) compared to the Nikon D50's maximum ISO 1600. The D40 has a very fast 1/500 flash sync, useful for daytime fill-flash. This compares to the typical 1/200 sync speed of other entry level and even some semi-pro DSLR cameras such as the Canon EOS 40D with its 1/250 sync speed.

Due to its hybrid electronic/mechanical shutter, it is in fact possible to flash sync the D40 beyond its published 1/500 maximum sync speed up to its maximum shutter speed of 1/4000. The D40x does not share this ability.

The D40 lacks a built-in autofocus motor, which means that only Nikon lenses designated with AF-I, AF-S or compatible focus motors can be used in autofocus mode.

Reception
The Nikon D40 was tested by various independent reviewers, receiving generally very favorable comments for its ergonomics and image quality.  It received some criticism for some of the compromises its designers made to keep the D40's price and size competitive. For example, Digital Photography Review, among many others, noted the loss of the screw-drive autofocus motor and the top LCD panel.

Nikon D40x 

On March 6, 2007, Nikon introduced the D40X, a sister camera to the D40. While identical in external design to the D40, it has a 10.2-megapixel CCD sensor, continuous shooting up to 3 frames per second, and a base sensitivity of ISO 100 (as noted above, each pixel in the 10.2-megapixel sensor receives less light than the pixels in the D40 sensor). It has a flash sync speed of 1/200 seconds compared to the D40's 1/500 seconds. It is otherwise identical.

The launch was accompanied by the introduction of a new consumer-level telephoto zoom with vibration reduction. Nikon ceased production of the D40X in December 2007, shortly before they introduced its successor, the Nikon D60.

Gallery

See also

List of Nikon compatible lenses with integrated autofocus-motor
Nikon EXPEED

References

External links
 Nikon D40 - Nikon global website
 Nikon D40x - Nikon global website
 PhotographyBlog.com

D40
D40
Cameras introduced in 2006
Cameras made in Thailand